Moulinet is a commune in the Lot-et-Garonne département in southwestern France.

Twin towns
 Moulinet is twinned with another Moulinet, in the French département of Alpes-Maritimes.

See also
 Communes of the Lot-et-Garonne department

References

External links

 Moulinet on the Institut Géographique National website

Communes of Lot-et-Garonne